The 2021–22 EHF Champions League knockout stage began on 30 March with the playoffs and ended on 19 June 2022 with the final at the Lanxess Arena in Cologne, Germany, to decide the winners of the 2021–22 EHF Champions League. A total of twelve teams will compete in the knockout phase.

Format
In the playoffs, the eight teams ranked third to sixth in Groups A and B played against each other in two-legged home-and-away matches. The four winning teams advanced to the quarterfinals, where they are joined by the top-two teams of Groups A and B for another round of two-legged home-and-away matches. The four quarterfinal winners qualified for the final four tournament at the Lanxess Arena in Cologne, Germany.

Qualified teams
The top six teams from Groups A and B qualified for the knockout stage.

Playoffs

Overview

|}

Matches

SG Flensburg-Handewitt won 60–57 on aggregate.

Paris Saint-Germain won 67–60 on aggregate.

Montpellier Handball won 64–56 on aggregate.

Telekom Veszprém won 61–53 on aggregate.

Quarterfinals

Overview

|}

Matches

Telekom Veszprém won 71–66 on aggregate.

Łomża Vive Kielce won 61–50 on aggregate.

THW Kiel won 63–62 on aggregate.

Barcelona won 60–53 on aggregate.

Final four
The final four will held at the Lanxess Arena in Cologne, Germany on 18 and 19 June 2022. The draw took place on 24 May 2022.

Bracket

Semifinals

Third place game

Final

References

External links
Official website

knockout stage